The Jetour X90 is a 5 to 7 seater mid-size crossover produced by Jetour, a brand launched in 2018 by Chery under the Jetour brand (division of Chery Commercial Vehicle).

Overview

The Jetour brand was officially released in January 2018, and the Jetour X90 is the third model of the brand. It was officially launched in January 2019, and at launch, the X90 was powered by a 1.5 liter Turbo engine.

The interior is equipped with a 9-inch central control display and a 12.3-inch LCD instrument that are standard for all trim levels, and the high-trim models are also equipped with front side airbags, front and rear head air curtains, panoramic sunroof, main driving 6-way and co-pilot 4-way electric adjustable leather seats, GPS navigation, car networking, electric heated mirrors, and independent air conditioners in the rear.

Powertrain
The Jetour X90 is powered by a 1.5 liter turbo inline-four petrol engine at launch, producing 156hp and 230 N·m, with transmission options including a 6-speed manual transmission or a 6-speed Dual-clutch transmission.

On September 25th, 2019, the Jetour X90 1.6 liter turbo engine model was launched. The 1.6 liter turbo variant is available in a total of 4 trims. The price ranges from 109,900 to 140,900 yuan (~US$15,429 – US$19,781). The 1.6 liter turbo engine is a ACTECO in-cylinder direct injection engine codenamed F4J16 by Chery, with a maximum power of 197 ps.

Jetour X90 Plus
A more premium facelift for the 2021 model year was launched during the 2021 Shanghai Auto Show called the X90 Plus. The X90 Plus features large screens for both the dashboards and the infotainment system. The middle of the console sits an airplane-style stick, rotary knob, and a touchpad control. The interior also features a platform for wireless charging, connectivity to various applications and 5G internet connection.

References

External links
Official website (X90)

Mid-size sport utility vehicles
Crossover sport utility vehicles
Cars introduced in 2019
Cars of China